Justice Arthur may refer to:

Claudeen Arthur (1942–2004), chief justice of the Supreme Court of the Navajo Nation
Thomas Arthur (Iowa judge) (1860–1925), associate justice of the Iowa Supreme Court

See also
Arthur Justice (1902–1977), Australian rugby league footballer